Irwin Kostal (October 1, 1911 – November 23, 1994) was an American musical arranger of films and an orchestrator of Broadway musicals.

Biography

Born in Chicago, Illinois, Kostal attended Harrison Technical High School, but opted not to attend college, instead teaching himself musical arranging by studying the symphonic scores available at his local library. His first professional job was as a staff arranger for Design for Listening, an NBC radio show based in his hometown. Irwin was one of four children born to James and Emma Kostal in a Czech enclave of Chicago. His siblings James, Jerome and Violet all remained in the Chicago area.

After moving to New York City, Kostal was hired for Sid Caesar's popular variety series Your Show of Shows, and followed this with a stint at The Garry Moore Show.

In the latter part of the decade he began working on Broadway, orchestrating for Shinbone Alley, The Music Man, Fiorello!, and West Side Story. His work on the latter resulted in his being hired to score the 1961 screen adaptation with Saul Chaplin, Johnny Green, and Sid Ramin. The quartet won both an Oscar and a Grammy Award for their contributions. Kostal later went on to collaborate with Saul Chaplin for the 1965 film adaptation of the Rodgers & Hammerstein musical The Sound of Music and won an Oscar for Best Music Scoring.

He also conducted the orchestra for several of the Firestone Christmas Albums.

For the remainder of his life, Kostal divided his time primarily between stage and screen, with an occasional detour into television to work with such people as Carol Burnett, Lucille Ball, and Leonard Bernstein. He supervised five of the Sherman Brothers musical film scores  (one of them being Mary Poppins) at four different movie studios between 1964 and 1978.  In 1982, he conducted the digital re-recording of the music to Walt Disney's 1940 animated feature Fantasia.

Selected shows

1954-56 Max Liebman's NBC Spectulars: The Merry Widow, Tales of Hoffmann, The Gypsy Baron, Der Fledermaus, The Desert Song with Nelson Eddy, Babes in Toyland, Naughty Marietta, Marco Polo and Lady in the Dark. Orchestrator
1956-57 Washington Square with Ray Bolger
1957 "Stanley" Series with Buddy Hackett and Carol Burnett. Composer, Arranger and Conductor
1957-58 The Patrice Munsel Show
1958-1963 The Gary Moore Show, Orchestrator
1958 Hans Brinker and the Silver Skates TV Special, Arranger and Conductor
1961 Candid Camera with Allen Funt and Arthur Godfrey
1962 Julie and Carol at Carnegie Hall, Arranged and Conducted
1965 Julie Andrews and Gene Kelly, Arranged and Conducted - Both Emmy Shows
1966 Lucy in London Arranged and Conducted
1966 Brigadoon Hallmark Hall of Fame (Emmy Show) with Robert Goulet and Sally Ann Howes
1971 Dick Van Dyke Special with Michel LeGrand Arranged and Conducted
1973 Dr. Jekyll and Mr. Hyde, A musical with Kirk Douglas, Arranged and Conducted - Emmy Nominated
1974 Old Faithful with Burgess Meredith, Jadon Robards and Zero Mostel
1978 The Million Dollar Dixie Deliverance, Disney TV Movie, Original Score, Arranged and Conducted

Death

Kostal died of a heart attack in Studio City, California. At the time of his death he was president of the American Society of Music Arrangers and Composers. In 2004 he was named a Disney Legend in recognition of his contributions to films released by the studio.

Additional filmography
 West Side Story (1961)
 Julie and Carol at Carnegie Hall (1962)
 Mary Poppins (1964)
 The Sound of Music (1965)
 Half a Sixpence (1967)
 Chitty Chitty Bang Bang (1968)
 Bedknobs and Broomsticks (1971)
 Charlotte's Web (1973)
 The Blue Bird (1976)
 Pete's Dragon (1977)
 The Magic of Lassie (1978)
 Fantasia (1982 rerelease of the 1940 film) (Digital re-recorded version)
 Mickey's Christmas Carol (1983)

Additional Broadway credits
West Side Story (1957)
Tenderloin (1960)
Sail Away (1961)
A Funny Thing Happened on the Way to the Forum (1962)
1491 (1969)
Gigi (1973)
Rex (1976)
Copperfield (1981)
Seven Brides for Seven Brothers (1982)

Additional awards and nominations
1962 - Academy Award - Best Music, Scoring of a Musical Picture, (West Side Story, winner))
1965 Academy Award for Best Music, Scoring of Music, Adaptation or Treatment (Mary Poppins, nominee)
1966 Academy Award for Best Music, Scoring of Music, Adaptation or Treatment (The Sound of Music, winner)
1972 Academy Award for Best Original Song Score and Adaptation (Bedknobs and Broomsticks, nominee)
1978 Academy Award for Original Song Score and Its Adaptation or Adaptation Score (Pete's Dragon, nominee)
1966 Emmy Award for Individual Achievements in Music - Conducting (The Julie Andrews Show, nominee)
1973 Emmy Award for Outstanding Achievement in Music Direction of a Variety, Musical or Dramatic Program (Dr. Jekyll and Mr. Hyde'', nominee)

References

External links

American film score composers
Best Original Music Score Academy Award winners
American music arrangers
American male conductors (music)
Animation composers
Jewish American film score composers
Grammy Award winners
1911 births
1994 deaths
20th-century American conductors (music)
20th-century American composers
American male film score composers
20th-century American male musicians
American people of Czech descent
20th-century American Jews